The Best Day(s) may refer to: 

 The Best Day (Thurston Moore album), 2014, or the title song
 The Best Day (Day6 album), 2018
 "The Best Day" (George Strait song), 2000
 "The Best Day" (Taylor Swift song), 2008
 "The Best Day", a short story by Orson Scott Card from the third book in the collection Maps in a Mirror, 1990
 "The Best Days", a 2001 song by Nikki Webster

 The Best Day2, a 2019 album by Day6

See also
 Best Day (disambiguation)